Riccardo Ghedin (born 5 December 1985) is an Italian tennis player. He began playing tennis when he was 12 years old.

At the 2009 Wimbledon Championships, Ghedin advanced successfully through the qualifying rounds to reach his first and only grand slam main draw.  He lost in 3 sets im the first round to Latvian Ernests Gulbis 2–6, 4–6, 4–6. In his career, he has reached 16 singles finals on the ITF Futures Tour which have resulted in winning 5  singles titles, and finishing runner-up 11 times.. In doubles, he has won 7 Challenger titles and 16 Futures titles.

Ghedin reached a career high singles ranking of world No. 222 on 10 August 2009. He reached a career high doubles ranking of world No. 109 on August 15, 2016.

He has played in 4 ATP Tour level matches, 3 in singles and 1 in doubles, however he has yet to win one.

ATP Challenger and ITF Futures finals

Singles: 16 (5–11)

External links
 
 

1985 births
Living people
Italian male tennis players
Tennis players from Rome
21st-century Italian people